PKP classes Ty2 and Ty42 is a class of freight (T) 2-10-0 (y) steam locomotive used by Polskie Koleje Państwowe (Polish State Railways, PKP) from 1942 (42) onwards. They are Deutsche Reichsbahn class 52 Kriegslokomotiven (war locomotives), either acquired new (Ty42), or secondhand (Ty2), having been built during World War II in factories in many European countries (Germany and occupied countries, including Poland) in 1942–1945.

History 
The purpose of this simplified, cheaper to manufacture and reliable locomotive was to operate rail routes in the territories acquired by the Third Reich in the east.

After the defeat of the Third Reich, 1207 locomotives of this series were inherited by the PKP. In 1962, Poland, due to an insufficient quantity of locomotives, had been forced to buy 220 machines from the Soviet Union. Two hundred of them were incorporated into the class, and 20 purchased from PMP PW Katowice. PKP locomotives renumbered the locomotives Ty2-1208 to Ty-1407, while the PW PMP locomotives kept the last four digits of their German number.

From 1945 until the end of steam traction operation, the Ty2 was the largest series of locomotives in Poland. 54 locomotives of this series are still in Poland today, including examples active in the Open Air Museum of rolling stock and railway equipment in Chabowka: the Ty2-911 (major repair July 2007) and the Ty2-953 (major repair April 2006). Ty2-953, among others, took part in the celebration of the 150th anniversary of railways in the Rybnik on 1 October 2006 and the 150th anniversary of the station in Tarnowskie Góry on 17 June 2007.

Traction capabilities 

References

External links 
 Ty2 pictures of steam locomotives, information about public events, etc.

Ty002
2-10-0 locomotives
Freight locomotives
Standard gauge locomotives of Poland
Railway locomotives introduced in 1942